Mariana Castanheira is a Brazilian microbiologist who is the Chief Scientific Officer at JMI Laboratories. Her research considers antimicrobial surveillance and the design. She was elected Fellow of the American Society for Microbiology in 2023.

Early life and education 
Castanheira studied pharmacy and biochemistry at the Federal University of São Paulo. She remained there for her PhD, studying molecular epidemiology and the mechanisms that underpin gram-positive and gram-negative bacteria. After earning her doctorate, she moved to the University of Bristol, where she studied beta-lactamase. She completed a postdoctoral fellowship at the Federal University of São Paulo in 2005.

Research and career 
Castanheira worked as a research scientist at QIAGEN for a year before joining JMI Laboratories, a microbiology laboratory in Iowa. She worked on antimicrobial surveillance, programs that are critical for understanding the prevalence of bacteria and fungi. She was appointed Chief Scientific Officer at JMI Laboratories in 2020. In 2023, Castanheira was made Fellow of the American Society for Microbiology.

Selected publications

References 

Brazilian microbiologists
Living people
21st-century Brazilian women scientists
21st-century Brazilian scientists
Fellows of the American Academy of Microbiology
Women microbiologists
Year of birth missing (living people)